This is a list of Victoria state soccer team results from 1883 to 2009.

Key

Key to matches
Att. = Match attendance
(H) = Home ground
(A) = Away ground
(N) = Neutral ground

Key to record by opponent
Pld = Games played
W = Games won
D = Games drawn
L = Games lost
GF = Goals for
GA = Goals against

Results
Victoria's score is shown first in each case.

References

Soccer in Australia